Events in the year 2007 in Kerala

Incumbents 

Governors of Kerala - R.L. Bhatia

Chief ministers of Kerala - V. S. Achuthanandan

Events 

 May - A massive Chickungunya outbreak in Central Travancore region of Kerala claims 40 lives.
 June 30 - A ship named MV Maria carrying iron materials from China to Albania sinks 10 km west of Kochi in Arabian Sea.
 December 30 - Chelembra bank robbery

Deaths 

 February 1 - A. V. Aryan, politician
 April 1 - Laurie Baker, 90, low cost Architect

See also 

 History of Kerala
 2007 in India

References 

2000s in Kerala